Baños de Molgas is a municipality in Ourense in the Galicia region of north-west Spain. It is located in the centre of the province.

References  

Municipalities in the Province of Ourense